Sir William Borlase (ca. 1564 – 4 September 1629) was an English politician who sat in the House of Commons between 1604 and 1614.

Borlase was the son of John Borlase of Buckinghamshire. He matriculated at Magdalen College, Oxford, on 17 November 1581, aged 17. He was a student of Gray's Inn in 1584, described as being of Little Marlow  (in Buckinghamshire). In 1601 he was High Sheriff of Buckinghamshire and was knighted at Beddington, Surrey on 28 June 1603. 

In 1604 he was elected Member of Parliament for Aylesbury and for Buckinghamshire in 1614. In 1624 he founded Sir William Borlase's Grammar School  on its present site in memory of his son Henry Borlase, MP for Marlow, who died in that year.

Borlase died at the age about 65 and was buried at Marlow on 10 September 1629. He was the father of Henry Borlase and William Borlase.

References

1560s births
1629 deaths
Alumni of Magdalen College, Oxford
Members of Gray's Inn
High Sheriffs of Buckinghamshire
English MPs 1604–1611
English MPs 1614
Knights Bachelor
Politicians awarded knighthoods